Mulashulla is a village in tehsil Beerwah of the district Budgam of the Jammu and Kashmir.

See also 
Otligam

Sechin Bonit

Gondipora

Beerwah,

Jammu and Kashmir

References 

Villages in Beerwah tehsil